Mae Faek is a tambon (subdistrict) of San Sai District, in Chiang Mai Province, Thailand. In 2020 it had a total population of 9,061 people.

Administration

Central administration
The tambon is subdivided into 12 administrative villages (muban).

Local administration
The whole area of the subdistrict is covered by the subdistrict municipality (Thesaban Tambon) Mae Faek (เทศบาลตำบลแม่แฝก).

References

External links
Thaitambon.com on Mae Faek

Tambon of Chiang Mai province
Populated places in Chiang Mai province